Cullen GAA is a Gaelic Athletic Association club based in the village of Cullen in the north-west of County Cork, Ireland. Cullen is part of the parish of Millstreet. The club plays Gaelic football  in the Duhallow division competitions. During the 2000s, the club won the Duhallow Junior A Football Championship for the first time since 1967. In 2004, however, they were beaten by Bride Rovers in the Cork Junior Football Championship. Two years later, in 2006, Cullen again won the Duhallow Junior A Football Championship.  Cullen won the 2008 Duhallow Junior A Football Championship and lost to Ballygarvan in the quarter-final of 2008 Cork Junior Football Championship.

Honours
 Duhallow Junior A Football Championship Winners (7) 1936, 1939, 1967, 2004, 2006, 2008, 2022  Runners-Up 2013, 2020, 2021
Ducon Cup Winners 2021, 2022

 Cork Junior Football Championship Runners-Up 1936

See also
 Duhallow GAA

References

Gaelic games clubs in County Cork
Gaelic football clubs in County Cork